Dave Olerich (born November 14, 1944) is a former professional American football player who played linebacker for seven seasons for the San Francisco 49ers, St. Louis Cardinals, and Houston Oilers.

References

1944 births
American football linebackers
San Francisco 49ers players
St. Louis Cardinals (football) players
Houston Oilers players
San Francisco Dons football players
Living people
People from Elmhurst, Illinois